Bowland cheese is a type of Lancashire cheese, with the cheese having been mixed with apple, sultana and cinnamon prior to setting.  It is named after the Forest of Bowland, which is situated in the east of Lancashire in England.

The idea of Bowland cheese was originally thought up by David Williams, the son of Godfrey Williams, owner of the delicatessen in Sandbach, Cheshire. It was produced in the back of the delicatessen on a small scale with the help of David's two assistants Karl Hollinshead and Matthew Barlow and quickly became popular with the local people of Sandbach. Due to the amount of interest, the idea was taken to the local cheese fairs of Nantwich and Knutsford where it gained popularity. Now Bowland cheese is produced on a much larger scale and supplies many supermarkets.

References
Speciality Cheese Info

English cheeses
Cow's-milk cheeses
Forest of Bowland